Sedimentary organic matter includes the organic carbon component of sediments and sedimentary rocks. The organic matter is usually a component of sedimentary material even if it is present in low abundance (usually lower than 1%). Petroleum (or oil) and natural gas are particular examples of sedimentary organic matter. Coals and bitumen shales are examples of sedimentary rocks rich in sedimentary organic matter.

Origin
Organic matter is essentially synthesized from mineral carbon (CO2) by autotroph organisms living at the boundaries between the geosphere, the atmosphere and the biosphere.

Sedimentary rocks